How People Change is a book published in 1973 by psychoanalyst Allen Wheelis.

References 

1973 non-fiction books
Harper & Row books